Fort Wayne Football Club is a pre-professional soccer club in Fort Wayne, Indiana, United States. The club currently competes in the Valley Division of the USL League Two, the fourth tier of the American Soccer Pyramid. Fort Wayne FC played home games in its first two seasons at Shields Field Stadium at Bishop Dwenger High School. On January 10, 2023, the club announced it would play home games in the 2023 and 2024 seasons at Bishop
John M. D’Arcy Stadium on the campus of the University of Saint Francis.

History 

Fort Wayne FC was founded by a group of local business people who wanted to provide a stepping stone for young and talented soccer players. In 2019, the club applied to and joined the National Premier Soccer League (NPSL) as an expansion team for the 2020 season. In a public announcement on September 9, 2019, City of Fort Wayne Mayor Tom Henry introduced the club to the city and Fort Wayne FC's president Dr. Erik Magner introduced Greg Mauch as the club's general manager. On December 19, 2019, the club announced Nick Potter and Russ Lawson as the club's assistant coaches.

On January 29, 2020, the club introduced Jeff Richey as the goalkeeper coach. Two weeks later, FWFC announced Mike Avery as the club's head coach.

On March 26, 2020, the NPSL announced the cancellation of the 2020 summer session due to the COVID-19 pandemic.

On October 28, 2020, USL League Two announced its addition of Fort Wayne FC into their league for the 2021 and 2022 season. It was also announced that Fort Wayne native and former United States men's national soccer team and Major League Soccer (MLS) player DaMarcus Beasley would be a co-owner of the club.  The club plans to join USL League One by 2023.

On May 9th, 2021, the club played their first-ever match, a 3-0 loss to Oakland County FC.

On May 23rd, 2021, the club played their first-ever home match in a 2-1 loss to Toledo Villa FC, where the club's first goal was scored by  forward Noe Garcia in front of a crowd of over 2,700.

On May 23rd, 2021, the club won their first-ever match, a 1-0 friendly win over Erie Commodores FC, the goal being scored by forward Max Amoako.

On June 11th, 2021, the club won their first USL League Two match, and first ever away match with a 3-1 win over Toledo Villa FC, with goals being scored by Pep Casas, Joe Kouadio and Breno Boccoli.

On June 25th, 2021, the Club hosted its first international-friendly match, welcoming the Chivas Guadalajara's U19 Reservas.

On August 31, 2021, the Club announced that Head Coach Mike Avery signed a contract extension for 2022 while also being appointed as Sporting Director for the club. Avery reports directly to and works alongside part-owner, DaMarcus Beasley. 

On September 22, 2021, the Club announced that Laurie Perolio-Bullinger would be leading Club Operations with DaMarcus Beasley leading Football Operations.

Colors and badge 

In 2022, Fort Wayne FC signed a multi-year agreement with global sports company, PUMA, as their official apparel partner.

“Fort Wayne FC is extremely excited to enter this new partnership with PUMA. Their brand values and what they stand for on and off the pitch absolutely aligns with our club,” commented DaMarcus Beasley, owner and sports operations director.  “This partnership isn’t just about the sport but how together we can inspire the next generation through the game of football. Their commitment to supporting our community efforts is what makes this a beautiful partnership. We are thrilled to wear the PUMA shirt and look forward to next year and beyond,” added Beasley.

The 2022 PUMA CUP branded home kit featured a bold design that incorporated a wavy design in royal blue and the away featured PUMA's Team Liga 25 red kit.

Fort Wayne FC's 2021 home kit was white, away kit was blue, and the goalkeeper's kit was red. The three-wave lines on the club's uniform jersey sleeves, shorts and socks represent the three rivers, St. Mary's River, St. Joseph River and Maumee River, of Fort Wayne. Symbols of the flag of Indiana, the flaming torch and its stars, can be found in front of the Fort Wayne FC uniform jersey.

Year-by-year

Players and staff

Roster 

Note: Flags indicate national team as defined under FIFA eligibility rules. Players may hold more than one non-FIFA nationality.

Front office and technical staff 
  Laurie Perolio-Bullinger, Operations Director
  DaMarcus Beasley, Football Operations Director
  Mike Avery, head coach, sporting director

References 

Association football clubs established in 2019
2019 establishments in Indiana
USL League Two teams
Soccer clubs in Indiana
Sports in Fort Wayne, Indiana

External links